Geisha Boys and Temple Girls is a studio album by British dance troupe Arlene Phillips' Hot Gossip. It was released in 1981 and was produced by BEF (former Human League members Martyn Ware and Ian Craig Marsh.)

Track listing

Personnel
Engineer - Nick Patrick, Peter Walsh (tracks: A1)
Lead vocals [soloist] - Alison Hierlehy (tracks: B3), Floyd (tracks: B3), Kim Leeson (tracks: A1, A4, B1), Richard Lloyd King (tracks: A2, B1, B4), Roy Gale (tracks: A3, A4, B4)
Producer - British Electric Foundation, (tracks: A1, A3 to B4)
Producer - Geoff Westley (A2)
Synthesizer [Roland Jupiter 4, Roland System 100, Synclavier Ii], electronic drums [Linn drum computer] - Ian Craig Marsh, Martyn Ware
Piano - Steve Travell (A1)
Guitar, bass - John Wilson (A3)
Drums - Simon Phillips (B1)

References

External links

1981 debut albums
Hot Gossip albums